The 2009 Assam serial blasts occurred on 6 April 2009 in the Maligaon and Dhekiajuli areas of the Assamese capital Guwahati on the eve of the Assamese Rajya Sabha MP and Indian Prime Minister's visit to address poll rallies. It also came during the campaigning phase of the 2009 Indian general election.

Background
In the light of 2008's attacks around the country, particularly the Mumbai attacks, as well as other bombings in Assam in both 2008 and New Year's Day 2009, this adds to the instability of the insurgency-racked Seven Sister States. After the Mumbai attacks security in the country was a major concern due to the elections. This led to a vociferous debate in the country of the ability to manage security along with the elections.

Follow-up
Earlier in the day suspected members of the militant outfit Karbi Longri National Liberation Front exploded a bomb near a BSF camp at Jengpha in the central Karbi Anglong district. Prime Minister Manmohan Singh was also scheduled to hold a poll rally in the district headquarters of Diphu, which itself was cancelled from the previous day due to unspecified reasons.

Bomb attacks   
The DGP of Assam said 7 were killed and 56 injured in the Maligaon blast at around 14:00 IST. The blast also sparked a fire that set ablaze two cars and 20 motorcycles as it spread to a three-storey building housing the area police station.

Hours later, five people were reported injured in the Dhekiajuli blast that was, according to reports, planted on a cycle. Six were killed at the blast site, while one succumbed to injuries after jumping from an adjacent building which had caught fire.

Perpetrators   
Though it was still too early to point any fingers the media said "suspected ULFA militants" had a hand in carrying out this attack. Assam DGP J M Srivastav said that "this is the handiwork of ULFA boys ahead of the outfit's 'Raising Day,'" while adding that the militants used hi-tech explosives.

Reactions
Assam CM Tarun Gogoi immediately acknowledged a lapse in security, saying the attack could have been prevented.

See also
2008 Assam bombings
2009 Guwahati bombings

References

Explosions in 2009
Terrorist incidents in India in 2009
April 2009 crimes
April 2009 events in India
2000s in Assam
21st-century mass murder in India
Mass murder in 2009
Terrorism in Assam
Improvised explosive device bombings in India
History of Guwahati